Nancy Juvonen (born May 18, 1967) is an American film producer. She and Drew Barrymore own the production company Flower Films.

Early life
Juvonen was born in Connecticut and raised in Mill Valley, California. Of Finnish descent, she is the daughter of aviation industry executive William H. Juvonen, a Stanford University alumnus and former Marine Aviator, and Pam Juvonen. Juvonen graduated from the University of Southern California with a degree in sociology and cooperative education.

Career
After graduating, she worked odd jobs, including at a dude ranch in Wyoming, as a private flight attendant, and for an artist who was trying to eradicate homelessness. She later became an assistant to Clarence Clemons, a member of the E Street Band. In 1993, Juvonen met Drew Barrymore through the former's brother Jim, a writer and producer who was working on the set of Mad Love. The two subsequently founded Flower Films.

Personal life
Juvonen married comedian Jimmy Fallon, host of The Tonight Show, on December 22, 2007. They met on the set of Saturday Night Live. In August 2007 Fallon proposed on the dock at sunset with a Neil Lane designed engagement ring at Nancy's family home in Wolfeboro on Lake Winnipesaukee in New Hampshire. They were married four months later. They have two daughters born in 2013, and born in 2014. Both were born via gestational surrogacy.

Filmography

References

External links
 
 Charlie's Angels producer Nancy Juvonen savvymiss.com

1967 births
American film producers
American people of Finnish descent
American women film producers
Film producers from California
Living people
People from Marin County, California
University of Southern California alumni
21st-century American women